Moonsville Collective is an Americana string band based out of Los Angeles, California

Background 
Born out of community jam sessions, Moonsville Collective launched in 2011 as a roots "supergroup" in Orange County, California, playing over 250 shows in California, Nevada and Utah during their first two years.  They have shared the stage with many well known acts such as Willie Watson (Old Crow Medicine Show), Donavon Frankenreiter, The White Buffalo, Wanda Jackson, Frank Fairfield, Rose's Pawn Shop, Restaurant & The Dustbowl Revival.  Moonsville Collective has headlined many of the local music festivals in Long Beach, Irvine and Costa Mesa and have performed at many private events for premier companies in the Outdoor Retail industry.

Awards
The band won “Best Country/Americana Band” at the 2013 OC Music Awards, as well as being named both “2012 Best Live Band” by OC Weekly and “Best Bluegrass/Americana Band in Orange County” by CBS Los Angeles.

Members 
Moonsville Collective has five members:  Father and son team "Dobro" Dan Richardson and upright bass Seth Richardson, lead vocalists & Guitar Corey Adams, mandolinist Matthew McQueen, & Phil Glenn on Fiddle & Vocals. The original lineup featured Ryan Welch, fiddle player Bill Bell and long-time drummer Drew Martin, and fiddle player Sean Kibler.

Albums
The group self-released two albums in early 2013, "Cradle to the Grave" (January, 2013) and "Salamander Sessions" (February, 2013), the latter of which is a live album of mostly traditional songs.  Both albums were re-released as a double disc set under Nashville based Indie label Rock Ridge Music, whom they signed with in November 2014.  In October 2015 the band released the long awaited full length album "Heavy Howl" to critical acclaim.  Also released through Rock Ridge Music, Heavy Howl showcased many of the group's strong instrumental abilities alongside the timeless songwriting styles of singers Ryan Welch and Corey Adams.

References

External links
Moonsville Collective Website
Rock Ridge Music Website

Moonsville Collective (band) 

Musical groups from California